was an educational institution in Ishinomaki City, Miyagi Prefecture, Japan. The school was destroyed in the 2011 Tōhoku earthquake and tsunami. 74 of its 108 students, who had been sheltering in the school on the instructions of their teachers rather than evacuating to higher ground, were killed in the tsunami as it ran up the nearby Kitakami River. Ten teachers also died. It was found that the school was unprepared for such an event, and that the scale of the tsunami had not been realized until it was too late. In 2014, the families of 23 of the children who died sued Ishinomaki City and Miyagi Prefecture for compensation. In October 2016, they were awarded compensation of ¥1.4 billion (US$12.8 million).

References 

Ishinomaki
2011 Tōhoku earthquake and tsunami
1873 establishments in Japan
Schools in Miyagi Prefecture
Educational institutions established in 1873
Buildings damaged by the 2011 Tōhoku earthquake and tsunami